Bender may refer to:

Slang
 Drinking binge
 Curveball, a type of pitch thrown in baseball
 Bender, a male homosexual, in British derogatory slang
 Sixpence (British coin), in archaic British slang

Fictional characters
 Bender (Futurama), a robot from the animated television series Futurama
 Bender, one who can manipulate a classical element in the Avatar: The Last Airbender franchise
 Elaine Bender, detective from the television series Blue Murder
 Goodloe Bender, from the movie The Road to Wellville
 John Bender (character), from the 1985 film The Breakfast Club played by Judd Nelson
 Ostap Bender, a con man in novels by Soviet authors Ilya Ilf and Yevgeni Petrov
 Bender (TV series), a 1979 TV series produced by Terry Becker

Places
 Bender, Moldova, a city
 Bender, Georgia, United States, a ghost town

Music
 Bender (band), an American hard rock band
 Bender (rapper) (1980–2018), Canadian rapper
 Ariel Bender, pseudonym of British rock guitarist Luther Grosvenor

Other uses
 Bender (surname)
 FC Dinamo Bender, Moldovan football club based in Bender
 Bender Machine Works, an American machinery manufacturer
 Bender tent, a type of makeshift shelter made using bended tree branches
 Pipe and tube bender, a machine which bends tube, pipe and solid metals
 Bloody Benders, a family of serial killers operating in Kansas in the 19th century.

See also
 B-Bender, a guitar accessory that allows the player to change the pitch of one or more strings "on the fly"
 Bend (disambiguation)
 Benders (disambiguation)
 Bending (disambiguation)
 Bendor (disambiguation)